Paul O'Brien may refer to:

 Paul O'Brien (scholar) (1763–1820), Irish language scholar and Catholic priest
 Paul O'Brien (Australian footballer, born 1948), VFL footballer for Fitzroy
 Paul O'Brien (Australian footballer, born 1950), VFL footballer for Carlton
 Paul O'Brien (chemist) (1954–2018), professor of chemistry
 Paul O'Brien (Australian footballer, born 1961), VFL footballer for Essendon and Melbourne 
 Paul O'Brien (Scottish footballer) (born 1967), Scottish footballer
 Paul O'Brien (equestrian) (born 1968), New Zealand equestrian
 Paul O'Brien (actor) (born 1978), Australian actor
 Paul O'Brien (rugby league), Australian rugby league footballer of the 1970s